Adolfo Aníbal Vaccaro Mena (born 9 December 1927) is a former football midfielder/forward and coach.

Vaccaro started his career at General Genes in his neighborhood of Villa Morra. He then went on to play for Atlántida SC and Olimpia Asunción before finishing his career in General Genes in 1955 where he played the role of player/manager and helped the team win the second division tournament in 1955, thus being promoted.

Other teams that he managed include Sportivo Clorinda (Argentina, 1961), 22 de Setiembre of Encarnación (1962), General Caballero de Cnel. Bogado (1964), Capitán Alfonso del Puerto de Misiones (1967) and Atlético Posadas de (from Posadas, Argentina).

References

1927 births
Possibly living people
Paraguay international footballers
Paraguayan footballers
Club Olimpia footballers
Paraguayan football managers
Association football wingers
Atlántida Sport Club players